Hardcourt Bike Polo is a variation of traditional Bicycle Polo in which teams of players ride bicycles and use mallets to strike a small ball into a goal. It may also be referred to as "Hardcourt", "Urban Bike Polo" or simply "Bike Polo".

The game 

There are two types of hardcourt bike polo. One is the traditional style called "3v3", which is a team consisting of 3 players and games are usually around 10–15 minutes in length. The other form is "Squad". Squad is a team of 4 to 6 players and games are between 30 and 40 minutes, allowing for substitutions. "Squad" is the smaller version of what used to be known as "Bench". Bench was a team of 7 to 12 players and games were between 60 and 90 minutes. All formats have a maximum of 3 players per team on the court at any given time. Typically, players play in an enclosed rectangular area, called a "court". Goals are placed at each long end of the court.

At the beginning of the game, the ball is placed in the middle of the court while the players wait behind their own goals. Following a countdown or a whistle, a player from each team charges the ball in what is termed the "joust".

A player may hit the ball in two ways: a "shot" or a "shuffle". A shot is made with either end of the mallet head whereas a shuffle is made with the side. In order to score a goal, a player must hit the ball into the opposing team's goal with a shot; if the player uses a shuffle, the goal does not count and play continues.

Following a goal, the scoring team returns to their own half of the court. After the scoring team returns to their half, the scored-on team may cross the half line and resume play.

The game continues until a team reaches either a limit of a predetermined length of time, depending on the format. 3v3 games are typically 10–15 minutes, while Squad games are typically 30–40 minutes.

A player who "dabs", (touches a horizontal surface with their foot), must undertake some form of remedial penalty before making contact with the ball again. This usually involves "tapping out" (riding to a designated point on the court and touching it with the mallet). It is also common to have to say "foot down" or "dab" to let other players know you are out of play, but not required. You should avoid affecting play of the game at all cost after a foot down occurs.

The amount of contact in a particular game may vary but is generally restricted to "mallet to mallet", "body to body". A "check" is allowed as long as it's "shoulder to shoulder" and deemed safe by the referee.

As a decentralized and organically growing game, the rules and styles of Hardcourt Bike Polo may vary substantially from city to city. The North American Bike Polo Association has created an official set of rules for North America, which has been influential to standardizing rules world-wide.

Since 2009, various governing bodies have been created within the polo community for the purposes of advancing the sport and creating rule sets.  The North American Hardcourt Bike Polo Association (NAHBPA) and European Hardcourt (EHBP) are the prime organizations, but there are others such as the Australasian Hardcourt (AHBP) and Bici Polo Latinoamerica (BPLA) organizations coming up as Bike polo spreads to other continents and countries all over the world.

Tournament format 
There are currently two types of tournament formats in hardcourt bike polo: 3v3 and Squad.

3v3 is the more traditional format of hardcourt bike polo, where 2 teams of 3 players play against each other.

An alternate format is Squad, where 2 teams of anywhere from 4-6 players play against each other. In Squad format, there are still 3 players on each team on the court at one time, but there is a bench of players that can be substituted throughout the game. Squad format games tend to be longer in duration, typically 30–60 minutes. There is usually a team captain in charge of substitutions, who may or may not be a player.

Equipment 

Rather than use traditional wooden polo mallets, Hardcourt Bike Polo players started making handmade mallets in the spirit of the DIY ethic. Since then, a number of companies have appeared, which are producing more distinct equipment, specifically for bike polo. Typical mallets are constructed using heads made from UHMW, and aluminium shafts similar to ski poles.

The ball used in bike polo is typically made from PVC and is identical to a Street Hockey ball. In 2012, the company, Fixcraft, team up with D-Gel, makers of hockey products, to produce the first official bike polo ball.

Some players make wheel covers out of corrugated plastic, polycarbonate, plastic netting, or even thick fabrics to protect spokes and create solid blocking surfaces. Many of these covers are painted with elaborate designs to help identify riders or their city's club. 

Low gear ratio single-speed bikes have advantages for quick acceleration and control on a small court. Although any bike is acceptable for the game, eventually most players customize their bikes especially for bike polo and their playing needs. Most riders prefer a short wheelbase for tight turning and a smaller "5-hole" as well as a medium to long stem for better turning.  Front brake or dual brake setups are the most popular.

Courts 
Players commonly play on courts such as tennis courts, street hockey rinks, basketball courts, or football courts. These are often customized using boards to keep the ball from rolling out of the court or getting stuck in the corners. The NAH currently mandates goals be 3 ft x 6 ft and must be placed no closer than 6 ft from the backboard.  Court size does vary, but for a court to be used in an official NAH event it must be no larger than 155 ft x 80 ft (47.25m x 25m) and no smaller than 120 ft x 60 ft (37m x 18m), and have 4 ft high solid boards.

Polo Specific Courts 
Some cities have worked with their local Polo club and have built facilities specifically for polo or suited for multi-use activities like Polo.  Some courts like New York City's "The Pit" are repurposed spaces, while other courts like East Vancouver's court in Grandview Park, are specifically designed to meet the needs of the sport. East Vancouver’s bicycle polo park in Grandview park project cost around $90,000 to complete and included concrete walls, drainage, paving, seating, and fencing.

History 

Modern Hardcourt Bike Polo has roots in early 2000s Seattle Originally started by messengers who had downtime in between deliveries, the game developed in Seattle and some of the earlier rules were founded (3 on 3, scoring with the end of the mallet).  As people moved and traveled the game branched out. and is currently played in over 30 countries and 300 cities.

Tournaments 

Since 2004, cities across North America have thrown inter-city tournaments such as the East-, West-, and Northside Polo Invites.

The first annual North American and European Hardcourt Bicycle Polo championships were both held in August 2009. The European tournament drew over 40 teams from Great Britain, France, Switzerland, Spain, Italy and Germany and was won by L'Equipe, a team from Geneva. The North American tournament featured 36 teams from Seattle, Vancouver BC, Milwaukee, Chicago, New York, Ottawa, Portland, Washington DC, and elsewhere and was won by Team Smile from Seattle. First prize for each tournament were tickets to the 2009 World Championships.

The first-ever world championships were held in Toronto in 2008 as part of the Cycle Messenger World Championships. There were representatives from Europe, however, hardcourt polo was still relatively new and the European teams elected not to play in the elimination bracket after seeing the level of play from the North American teams leading to this tournament being considered unofficial. Heat Lightning (Doug Dalrymple, Paul Rauen, and Zach Blackburn) won this early world tournament, using a high energy "die by the sword" playing strategy. The following year, 2009, featured teams from the US, Canada, England, France, Germany, Switzerland, and Italy. The winners were the then North American Champions, Team Smile, who defeated the team from East Vancouver in a repeat of the North American final. The 2009 event is considered the first official world championship.

National championships have been held in countries around the world, including Australia, New Zealand, United Kingdom, United States, and Germany.

In 2016, the North American Hardcourt Bike Polo Association announced that they were changing the format for all of their sanctioned tournaments from 3v3 to Squad.

World Hardcourt Bike Polo Championships

European Hardcourt Bike Polo Championships

North American Hardcourt Bike Polo Championships

Australasian Hardcourt Bike Polo Championships

Asia Hardcourt Bike Polo Championships

Latin American Hardcourt Bike Polo Championships

Ladies Army

See also 

 Cycle polo

References

External links 
 European Hardcourt Bikepolo Association
  North American Hardcourt Bike Polo Association

Cycle polo
Articles containing video clips